Areeya Sirisopa or Areeya Chumsai (nicknamed "Pop"(born June 28, 1971)) is a Thai model, lecturer and filmmaker.

Early life and education
Areeya Chumsai was born in Ann Arbor, Michigan, the United States, the daughter of Thai immigrants. She spent her childhood and adolescent years in the state of Michigan and received a degree in journalism from Michigan State University in 1993.

Pageantry
Upon completion of her undergraduate studies, she traveled to Thailand to visit relatives and found a side job as a model for various fashion magazines. Within a year, she qualified for the Miss Thailand pageant and won the crown in 1994.  She went on to compete in the Miss Universe pageant held in the Philippines, placing 13th overall; and recipient of the "Best Kodak Smile."

During her reign as Miss Thailand, she began working as a model, actress, and emcee.

Career

Teaching career
Upon completion of her reign as Miss Thailand, Areeya went on to teach English and writing to Thai students at Bangkok University and later Chulalongkorn University. In 1995, she became a military officer at the Chulachomklao Royal Military Academy ranked as a 2nd Lieutenant while teaching English to Thai soldiers.  Her experiences in the military were later described in her book "Bootcamp."  She also wrote a column for the Thai fashion magazine Praew and continued to model. In 1999, she worked as a spokesperson/model for Hitachi, Ltd., appearing in both print and television advertisements.   In 2000, she became the first Thai woman to receive the 13th Tokyo Creation Award, awarded for her social service.

Filmmaker and current activities
In 2005, she co-directed alongside Nisa Kongsri the film Innocence (Dek toh), which documented the schooling and lives of the hill tribe children in northern Thailand. Chumsai and Kongsri lived among the hill tribe people for months as teachers and students lived together growing crops, cooking meals, and continuing the education process. The film opened to positive reviews and has been shown in several film festivals throughout the world, receiving several accolades including most recently the EIDF2006 "Spirit Award" in Korea. Proceeds from the film have gone to the hill tribe children; in addition, Chumsai and Kongsri have continued to raise awareness across the country and through their charity work.

References

External links

Brown, Samantha: Beauty and brains: Areeya 'Pop' Chumsai (interview), 2005. Retrieved November 27, 2006.

Areeya Chumsai
Areeya Chumsai
Areeya Chumsai
Areeya Chumsai
Miss Universe 1994 contestants
American people of Thai descent
People from Ann Arbor, Michigan
Film directors from Michigan
Michigan State University alumni
1971 births
Living people
Areeya Chumsai